The National Committee for the Furtherance of Jewish Education (NCFJE) is a non-profit organization run by the Chabad-Lubavitch movement. It is a division of the Chabad movement's educational arm, Merkos L'Inyonei Chinuch.

Founding
The organization was founded in 1940 by Rabbi Yosef Yitzchak Schneersohn. The organization was run by Rabbi Jacob J. ("J.J.") Hecht from 1940 until his death in 1990.

The organization's current chairman is Rabbi Shea Hecht. Rabbi Sholem Ber Hecht is the organization's director.

Activities 
The organization runs over 35 different social and religious programs such as Camp Emunah and several Jewish summer camps for children, 
"Released Time Program", which provides Jewish educational classes for children in public schools (see released time).
Toys for hospitalized children,
A food Pantry in Brooklyn, NY,
Anti Shmad,
JSF a summer fellowship program (former ILTSE),
Hadar Hatorah,

References

External links

Chabad organizations
Jewish organizations established in 1940
Yosef Yitzchak Schneersohn
1942 establishments in the United States